John William Cope (23 November 1899 – 1 April 1979) was an English footballer who played at left-back, and was noted for his tough-tackling ability. He played a total of 200 league games in a nine-year career in the Football League with Bolton Wanderers and Port Vale. He helped the "Valiants" to win the Third Division North title in the 1929–30 season. He returned to Port Vale shortly after World War II, and remained as a coach at the club until shortly before his death.

Career
Cope played for Leek Alexandra, before he joined Bolton Wanderers, as the "Trotters" posted an eighth-place finish in the First Division in 1925–26. They rose up to fourth place in 
1926–27, before dropping down to seventh position in 1927–28. In the 1928–29 campaign, his last at Burnden Park, Bolton finished in 14th spot. They twice won the FA Cup during his time there, though he never featured in a cup final.

Cope signed with Port Vale in July 1929. He was a member of the 1929–1930 Third Division North title winning season, featuring in 43 of the "Valiants" 45 games. He appeared 37 times in the 1930–31 season, as Vale posted a club record finish of fifth in the Second Division. He featured 33 times in the 1931–32 campaign, as the club sunk to just finish above relegated Barnsley on goal average. He then lost his first team place at The Old Recreation Ground, and played just three games in the 1932–33 season. He went on to feature 14 times in the 1933–34 campaign, before he was released from the club. In October 1947, he returned to Port Vale as the assistant trainer, and remained a part of the back-room staff until he retired in January 1976.

Career statistics
Source:

A.  The "Other" column constitutes appearances and goals in the League Cup, Football League Trophy, Football League play-offs and Full Members Cup.

Honours
Port Vale
Football League Third Division North: 1929–30

References

1899 births
1979 deaths
Footballers from Stoke-on-Trent
English footballers
Association football fullbacks
Bolton Wanderers F.C. players
Port Vale F.C. players
English Football League players
Association football coaches
Port Vale F.C. non-playing staff